"The Greatest" is a song by American singer and songwriter Lana Del Rey. The track was released as the second promotional single from Del Rey's sixth studio album, Norman Fucking Rockwell! on August 22, 2019. On August 22, 2019, Del Rey released a "double feature" music video with "The Greatest" and "Fuck It I Love You". Later that day, she released the two as a joint promotional single on digital outlets. It was sent to Italian radios on September 13, 2019, as the fifth single from the album.

Writing and composition
The track was written and produced by Del Rey and Jack Antonoff. Lyrically, Del Rey sings about missing the "good old days" in her relationship and the world in general, but further expressing frustrations with how the world has changed: "The culture is lit, and if this is it‚ I had a ball/I guess that I'm burned out after all ... If this is it, I'm signing off". Del Rey makes numerous pop culture references including to the David Bowie song "Life on Mars", Instagram livestreams, The Beach Boys, the destructive effects of the 2018 California wildfires, and her infamous feud with rapper Kanye West due to his support of President Donald Trump.

Music video
Placed in the second half of her "double feature" music video, the song plays after tumbling waves and a drone shot of Long Beach serve as prelude. Featuring the same bar sequence from the "Fuck It, I Love You" portion of the video, Del Rey continues to sing in front of a neon-gradient backdrop while new clips of her wandering the Long Beach harbor in a Venice "Locals Only" jacket. Reminiscent of shots from her video for "Ride", Del Rey plays darts and pool in the bar accompanied by older, biker-like men. Shots of a jukebox show a series of songs Del Rey has covered including "Doin' Time" by Sublime and "Chelsea Hotel #2" by Leonard Cohen, as well as "Life on Mars" by David Bowie, "Pacific Ocean Blue" by Dennis Wilson, "Kozmic Blues" by Janis Joplin and "Grace" by Jeff Buckley and "Bluebirds over the Mountain" by Ritchie Valens among others. Towards the end of the video, happy bar patrons are shown (one of them being Del Rey's brother Charlie). The video ends with a shot of Del Rey sitting on a boat "heading forward", similar to how she was in the cover art for the album.

The video was directed by Rich Lee, who had previously directed the videos for "Love", "Lust for Life", and "White Mustang", among others. Standing over nine minutes in length, the video has also been considered to be a short film. While Del Rey has released visuals for "Mariners Apartment Complex" and "Venice Bitch" from the album, she has referenced the double-feature as her "first video from the album" numerous times.

Critical reception
The song received widespread critical acclaim upon its release, with numerous music critics calling it one of her best songs. Claire Shaffer of Rolling Stone stated that the song features "Del Rey reflect[ing] on the state of pop... as well as the state of the world." Tosten Burks of Spin wrote that both "Fuck It, I Love You" and "The Greatest" were "surf-ish rock ballads that reflect on California's lost mystique." James Rettig of Stereogum further praised the California sound and called both songs "two more promising glimpses of Norman Fucking Rockwell." Writing for NME, Rhian Daly called the song "maybe one of the greatest songs she's ever written." Designating the song 'Best New Track', Pitchforks Sam Sodomsky wrote:

Critics' lists

Charts

Release history

Notes

References

2010s ballads
2019 songs
Lana Del Rey songs
Rock ballads
Songs about California
Songs written by Lana Del Rey
Songs written by Jack Antonoff
Surf rock songs
Music videos directed by Rich Lee